Urmas Sisask (9 September 1960 – 17 December 2022) was an Estonian composer.

Biography
Sisask was born in Rapla on 9 September 1960. One of the major inspirations for his music was astronomy. Based on the trajectories of the planets in the Solar System, he created the "planetal scale", a mode consisting of the pitches C#, D, F#, G#, and A. Later, he discovered to his surprise that this was exactly the same as the Japanese Kumajoshi mode, which is also known as the Japanese pentatonic scale. 

Sisask was a Roman Catholic, and much of what he composed was sacred music. His younger sister is singer and actress Siiri Sisask.

Sisask died on 17 December 2022, at the age of 62.

Discography
 Starry Sky Cycle (Estonian: "Tähistaeva tsükkel") (1980–1987)
 Gloria Patri (1988)
 Pleiads ("Plejaadid") (1989)
 Milky Way ("Linnutee galaktika") (1990)
 Andromeda ("Andromeda galaktika") (1991)
 Benedictio (for mixed chorus) (1991)
 Christmas oratorio ("Jõuluoratoorium") (1992)
 Magnificat
 Missa Nr. 1
 Symbiotic Symphony ("Sümbiootiline Sümfoonia")
 Comet Hyakutake
 Ave Sol
 Missa Nr. 4 op. 46: Christmas mass ("Jõulumissa")
 Polaris ("Põhjanael")
 Veni Sancte Spiritus

References

External links

 

1960 births
2022 deaths
20th-century classical composers
21st-century classical composers
Estonian Roman Catholics
Tallinn Music High School alumni
People from Rapla
Male classical composers
Estonian Academy of Music and Theatre alumni
20th-century Estonian composers
21st-century Estonian composers
20th-century male musicians
21st-century male musicians
Recipients of the Order of the White Star, 4th Class